A list of significant buildings and facilities, existing or demolished, owned by or closely associated with Cornell University in Ithaca, New York. Several buildings were on the National Register of Historic Places, including  Bailey Hall, Caldwell Hall, Computing and Communications Center (formerly Comstock Hall), East Roberts Hall (demolished), Fernow Hall, Morrill Hall, Rice Hall, Roberts Hall (Demolished), and Stone Hall (demolished). Also Telluride House, Deke House, and Llenroc.

Architects who are Cornell alumni are listed with their class year.

Central (Main) campus
Academic, administrative, and athletics buildings between Cascadilla Gorge and Fall Creek Gorge.

West Campus, Collegetown, and Downtown
The Gothic dormitories on West Campus were originally established as the men's residence area. The Class Halls and Noyes Community Center were built behind the Gothics after World War II. The West Campus Initiative demolished the Class Halls and old Noyes between 2005-2008 and in their place were built the Bethe, Rose, Becker, and Keeton residences and Noyes Recreation Center.

North Campus
North Campus was originally established as the location for women's residences, starting with Risley, Donlon, and Dickson Halls. A suite system was introduced with the construction of five Low Rises, two High Rises, and Robert Purcell Union, built between 1969-1975 and designed by Gyo Obata of Hellmuth, Obata and Kassbaum. The 2001 North Campus Residential Initiative attempted to bring "order to the chaos" of North Campus.

Demolished or former buildings

References

Cornell University
Cornell
 List
Cornell University